The Boulder River is a small river in the north of the South Island of New Zealand.

The headwaters are at the Kahurangi National Park's small Boulder Lake.  The river flows north for  before draining into the Aorere River.

Rivers of the Tasman District
Kahurangi National Park
Rivers of New Zealand